Seventh grade (or grade seven) is a year or level of education. The seventh grade is the eighth school year, the second or third year of middle school, and the first year of junior high school. Students are around 12-13 years old in this stage of education. Different terms and numbers are used in other parts of the world.

Around the world

Argentina
In Argentina, 7th grade is the final grade of Primary School

Australia
In Australia, Year 7 is the first year of secondary school. It is actually the eighth year of schooling (Prep/Foundation, 1 to 6, then Year 7). In Australia, Year 7 students are aged 12–13 years old.

Belgium
In Belgium the 7th grade is the first year of high school. When reaching the age of 12 or 13, the children go from primary school (“basisschool”) to Secondary school (“middelbare school”).

The 7th grade is a warming up for the rest of the high school period. It is also used to reference students their capability, to make sure they belong to the right level of education. Students here learn the languages Dutch, French and English (this is their first year learning English) in the northern part of Belgium (Flanders), and learn French or German and can choose between Dutch, English, German or French in the southern and German part of Belgium,  just as their own language (Dutch, French or German) skills. Other classes in the 7th grade are: Biology, Mathematics, Chemistry, Art & Music, Geography, Physics, Physical education (gym), Social studies, Religion (depends on the school itself) and Computer science (Computer science in 7th grade means learning to work with computers properly, though most of the student already have a good understanding of how to use computers).

Belgium uses a system, where specific education is accommodated in the high school period, which also is chosen by the student before they choose to go to work or continuing at a university.

Brazil
In Brazil, the time for elementary school was recently raised from 8 to 9 years, and the minimum age required to enter the seventh grade was not changed. The students are usually between 11 and 13. In the seventh grade, all students must be 12 years old before March 31 or May 31 depending on school.

Bulgaria
In Bulgaria, it would correspond to седми клас or 7-ми клас. Students are usually 13 years old. Учи се математика, биология, физика и мн.др.

Canada
Grade 7 in Canada is the first year of junior high school, middle school, or the second last grade of junior/elementary school. Intermediate schools (grades 6, 7 and 8) provide education in Literature and Mathematics, as well as History, Geography, Music, Drama, Dance, Science (Biology, Chemistry and Physics in particular), Art, French (English if in French Immersion), and Physical Education (phys ed. or gym). French and ‘foreign’ languages, which used to be taught only at high schools, are now introduced during the last 2 years of elementary school and all years of middle school.

Egypt
In Egypt, this is the first year of the Middle School. Usually students who are in 7th grade are 11, 12, 13 years old.

Finland
In Sweden and Finland, this is the seventh year of compulsory school and either the second or first year of "junior high", depending on the size of the schools in the district.

France
In France, seventh grade is called cinquième (5ème), meaning 5th, as in 5 years before the class of Terminale, during which most students take the Baccalauréat. 5ème is the second year of the French secondary school, which is called collège. Most pupils in this grade are 12-year-olds.

Germany
In Germany, the equivalent grade is 7. Klasse.

Greece
In Greece, seventh grade is called first year of gymnasium school or middle school, or lower secondary school (Proti Gymnasiou - Πρώτη Γυμνασίου)

Hong Kong
In Hong Kong, pupils aged 12 to 13 are in Secondary 1 or Form 1, the first year of secondary education.

India

In India grade seven is called Class 7 and forms middle school. Class 7 forms the second year in middle school. Pupils aged 12 to 13 attend class 7. Students are introduced to more complex mathematics,science among other subjects. In most schools, social studies is divided into history, civics and geography at this stage. Seventh class is the second last class in the secondary education system of India.Education_in_India#Secondary_education. 11 Year olds can also be enrolled in 7th if they are born between January to March 31st as the year ends here. This results in them being earlier off their batch

Indonesia
In Indonesia grade seven is called class VII and forms the first year in junior high school. Students are aged 12 to 13 years.

Iran
In Iran, Grade 7 is the first year of Highschool A. There are 2 stages of Highschool in Iran: A and B. A ranges from grade 7 to 9 and B ranges from 9 to 12.
Most of Iranian 7 graders are 13 years old.

Ireland
The Irish equivalent to seventh grade is First Year, which is the first year of secondary education. Students are usually 12–13 years old. This is usually the time when students begin having different teachers for different subjects, and move classrooms after each period.

Israel 
In Education in Israel, in most formal places, the seventh grade is the first year of middle school.

Malaysia
In Malaysia, the seventh grade can be referred as Form 1. It is the beginning of student's secondary school after completing primary school at the age of 12.

Netherlands
In the Netherlands the 7th grade is the first class of high school, also named "brugklas" (bridge class). When reaching the age of 12 or 13, the children go from primary school (“basisschool”) to high school (“middelbare school”).

Besides Dutch, students will learn foreign languages such as German, French and English. Higher levels of 7th grade curriculum include Latin, Greek, Chinese and/or Spanish.

Other classes in the 7th grade are: Biology, Mathematics, Chemistry, Art, Music, Geography, History, Physics, Physical education (“gym”), Social studies, Theatre Religion (depends on the school itself) and Computer science.

After 4, 5 or 6 years (depending on the level of education) one can get their diploma, which grants access to specific education, like the university or HBO and MBO education. These are educations that focuses on specific talents, chosen by the student to prepare them for a job environment.

New Zealand
In New Zealand, Year 8 (formerly Form 2) is the equivalent of seventh grade, with students aged 12 or 13 during the year. Seventh Grade is the last grade/year in Intermediate School.

Norway
In Norway, students enter the seventh grade the year they turn twelve years old. This is the final year of Barneskole (literally Kids School), equivalent to Elementary School.

Pakistan
In Pakistan grade seven is called Class Seven and forms middle school. They are usually 13 years old.

Philippines
In the Philippines, Grade 7 or Freshman Year is the first year of Junior High School and High School curriculum. Students are usually 12–13 years old.

It was formerly named as 1st Year or Year I until it changed to Grade 7 on June 4, 2012 upon the start of School Year 2012-2013 due to the implementation of the K-12 curriculum. The changing of the name from 1st Year to Grade 7 also started the phaseout of the educational system that has been in use since 1945 which was completed five years later in June 5, 2017 upon the implementation of K-12 curriculum on Grade 6.

Romania
In Romania, seventh grade is called Seventh Class, being the third year of secondary education, when students start preparing for the national exam, which takes place at the end of 8th grade as a form of high school admission test.

Russia
In Russia, students in seventh grade are usually 12–14 years old. It is third grade of the middle school. Children study such subjects as: Algebra, Geometry, Russian language, foreign language (often English), Physics, Biology, History, Social studies, Geography, Arts, Literature, Music, Physical Education, Information Technologies, labour training (wood processing, sewing, cooking), in some regions native languages.

Saudi Arabia
In Saudi Arabia, seventh grade is the first year of Middle School.

Singapore
In Singapore, seventh grade is called Secondary One, and it is the start of one's secondary education after one completes primary education. Pupils are typically at the age of 13 in seventh grade.

South Africa
In South Africa, Grade 7 is the final year of primary school and is also the final year before High School as there is no such thing as Middle School in South Africa. Pupils (called Learners by the Department of Education) are usually between the ages of 11,12 and 13.

Grade 7 is usually the last grade on primary on South African schools,grade 7 in RSA has 3 additional subjects (Economic and management sciences, Creative Arts and Life sciences)

Sweden
In Sweden and Finland, this is the seventh year of compulsory school and either the second or first year of "junior high", depending on the size of the schools in the district.

Taiwan
In Taiwan, seventh grade refers to two things: students in the first year of junior-high but also to people born between the years 70-79 (the seventh decade) of the Minguo calendar, which equates to between 1981 and 1990.

United Kingdom
In England and Wales, pupils aged between 12 and 13 are in Year 8 which is the second year of Secondary School. The Scottish equivalent is Secondary 2 or S2 - the second year of Secondary education. The Northern Irish equivalent is Year 9 or Second Form, the second year of secondary education.
It is rare for pupils younger than 12-13 to enter Year 8.

United States
In the United States, in mathematics, 7th grade students begin to go more into pre-algebra or the beginnings of algebra including ratios, proportions, and percentages. New topics sometimes include scientific notation, concepts with negative numbers or integers, and more advanced geometry. Some schools allow advanced students to take an Algebra I course instead of following the standard 7th grade math curriculum early in the United States.

In social studies, advanced pre-Civil War History is taught. Though American history is usually the most common, other cultures and time periods may sometimes be taught, including state and capital history (in, for example, Texas and South Carolina), and European history (in Connecticut and New Jersey).

In science, it is usually moderate-level biology, although 7th graders can also study life science, physical science, and earth science topics too. In some parts of the United States, the students have a different class/teacher for each of their subjects, and so the students change and rotate classrooms at the end of each classroom period. Foreign language is often introduced at this level, 7th graders can often choose from several different languages depending on their school's language abilities.

In English language arts, students learn about theme, citing textual evidence, characterization, figurative language, compare and contrast, writing narratives, writing research reports, writing explanatory essays, and writing persuiave and argumentative pieces.

In the United States 41 states have implemented Common Core standards for 7th grade curriculum. Key English and Language Arts Common Core Standards for 7th grade students include:

 Ability to cite textual evidence to support analysis and inferences drawn from the text
 Analyze how an author develops and contrasts the points of view of different characters in a text
 Compare and contrast a written work to its audio, staged, or multimedia counterpart, including analysis of the effects of techniques unique to each medium

See also
 Educational stage

References

External links 
 7th grade math practice

7
Secondary education